R. is the third solo album by American singer R. Kelly, released as a double album on November 10, 1998, by Jive Records. It marked the first time Kelly worked with other producers as opposed to producing the entire album himself. Its cover artwork uses the same image of Kelly from his 1993 debut 12 Play, only in silhouette form.

Upon its release, R. went to number one on the Top R&B/Hip-Hop Albums chart and number two on the US Billboard 200, selling over 612,000 copies in its first week of sales. It spawned Kelly's second number-one Billboard Hot 100 hit "I'm Your Angel", as well as the number-one Top R&B hit "I Believe I Can Fly", which had been released two years earlier on the Space Jam soundtrack. R. is currently Kelly's best-selling release to date, having sold over eight million copies in the United States and over 12.4 million copies worldwide.

Track listing
All songs written and produced by R. Kelly, except where noted.

Disc one

Disc two

Awards and nominations
BMI Awards – 1998 Pop Songwriter of the Year (won for "I Believe I Can Fly," "I Can't Sleep Baby (If I)," and "I Don't Want To by Toni Braxton)

Grammy Awards – 1999 Best Pop Collaboration With Vocals (nominated for "I'm Your Angel"), 2000 Best R&B Vocal Performance – Male (nominated for "When a Woman's Fed Up"), 2000 Best R&B Album (nominated)

Soul Train Music Awards – 1999 Best R&B/Soul Single, Male (nominated for "Half on a Baby"), 1999 Sammy Davis Jr. Entertainer of the Year Award (won), 1999 Best R&B/Soul Album, Male (won), 1999 Best R&B/Soul or Rap Album (won)

Personnel

R. Kelly – arranger, conductor, instruments, keyboards, mixer, producer, writer, main vocals, background vocals
Keith Murray – vocals
G-One – arranger, keyboards, mixer, producer, programming
Chris Puram – mixer
Kelly Price – background vocals
Rob Bacon – guitar
Marek – assistant mix engineer, assistant recording engineer
Anthony Kilhoffer – assistant recording engineer
Esther Nevarez – assistant recording engineer
Dana Walsh – assistant recording engineer
Sean "Puffy" Combs – producer
Ron Lawrence – producer
Stevie J. – co-producer
Tony Maserati – mixer
Jimmie Lee Patterson – assistant mix engineer
Champ – assistant recording engineer
Tone – co-producer, producer, background vocals, programming
Poke – co-producer, producer, programming
Stephen George – mixer, programming
Greg Landfair – guitar
Kendall D. Nesbitt – additional keyboards
Antonio L. Daniels – additional keyboards
Roy Hamilton – drum programming, vocoder programming
Blake Chaffin – programming
Brian Calicchia – assistant mix engineer
Jeff Vereb – assistant mix engineer, assistant recording engineer
LaFayette Carthon, Jr. – additional keyboards, background vocals, conductor
Paul J. Falcone – programming
Jason Groucott – assistant mix engineer
Brian Garten – assistant recording engineer, programming
Sparkle – background vocals
UB Tirado – assistant mix engineer
Jeffrey Lane – assistant mix engineer, assistant recording engineer
Stan Wood – assistant recording engineer
Bryon Rickerson – assistant recording engineer
Mark Johnson – assistant mix engineer
Greg Thompson – assistant mix engineer
Cory Rooney – co-producer, additional keyboards
Kevin Crouse – mixer
Chris Ribando – assistant recording engineer
Cam'Ron – vocals
Noreaga – vocals
Shawn Carter – vocals
Vegas Cats – vocals
Joey Donnatello – mixer, programming
Ron Lowe – assistant mix engineer
Jason Goldstein – assistant recording engineer
Paul Riser – arranger, conductor, orchestrator, strings
Hart Holliman – arranger, conductor, orchestrator
The Motown Romance Orchestra – arranging, strings and horns
Keith Henderson – guitar
Blackie – background vocals
Rock – background vocals
Chris Brickley – assistant recording engineer
Tony Gonzalez – assistant recording engineer
Bruce Kelly – background vocals
Tony Black – additional engineering, digital editing
Jason Bacher – assistant recording engineer
Trey Fratt – assistant recording engineer
Rick Behrens – assistant recording engineer
Cynthia Jernigan – additional writing
Nathan Dean – assistant mix engineer, assistant recording engineer
Eric N. Yoder – programming
Deatia Staples – background vocals
Keisha Wallace – background vocals
Lamont Smith – background vocals
Shawn L. Lawson – background vocals
Marjette J. Alston – background vocals
Bryant M. Lee – background vocals
Suzan Chatims – background vocals
Denise Purkett – background vocals
Reynonda McFarland – background vocals
Monique Whittington – background vocals
Opal Staples – background vocals
Angela Clayton-Lawson – background vocals
Foxy Brown – vocals
Al West – co-producer, keyboards
Rich Travali – mixer
Chuck Bailey – assistant mix engineer
Jon Heidelberger – assistant recording engineer
Johnny Allen – assistant to the conductor
J. Squillace – orchestra recording assistant
Crucial Conflict – vocals
Todd Parker – assistant mix engineer
Ruth Varella – assistant recording engineer
Edward Tucker – background vocals
Russell Hinton – background vocals
Michael McCoy – assistant mix engineer
Humberto Gatica – mixer
Rob Mathes – arranger, conductor
Loris Holland – additional keyboards, background vocals, conductor, Hammond B-3 organ
Steve Skinner – keyboards, drum programming
Jeff Bova – additional keyboard programming
Jimmy Bralower – drum programming
Jeffrey Morrow – background vocals
Yvonne Gage – background vocals
Cheryl Wilson – background vocals
Joan Walton – background vocals
Robert Bowker – background vocals
Johnny Rutledge – background vocals
Robin Robinson – background vocals
Rob Trow – background vocals
Cathy Richardson – background vocals
Anthony Ransom – background vocals
Lisa Lougheed – background vocals
Stevie Robinson – background vocals
Tawatha Agee – background vocals
Troy Bright – background vocals
Dennis Collins – background vocals
Ayana George – background vocals
Diva Gray – background vocals
Nancey Jackson – background vocals
Latasha Jordon – background vocals
Paulette McWilliams – background vocals
Robert Moe – background vocals
Fonzi Thornton – background vocals
Spencer Washington – background vocals
Elizabeth Withers – background vocals
Don Hachey – assistant recording engineer
Céline Dion – vocals, background vocals
Bill Douglass – assistant recording engineer
Jason Stasium – assistant recording engineer
Chris Brooke – assistant recording engineer
Brian Callicha – assistant recording engineer
Jake Ninan – assistant recording engineer
Nasir Jones – vocals
"The Luv Club" Choir – background vocals
Percy Bady – director, keyboards
Tom Recchion – art direction and design
Jackie Murphy – photo shoot/art coordination
Reisig & Taylor – photography
June Ambrose – stylist
Mode Squad – stylist
Robin Hannibal – groomer
Aliesh Peirce – groomer
TAR – original cover photo
Kenneth Halsband – location manager
Bruce Goldman – location manager
Leon Adair – location manager
Beata Rosenbaum – casting
Michael Anthony – make-up
Reginald Payton – car shots
Howard Simmons – interior shots
Barry Hankerson – executive producer
'Big Bass' Brian Gardner – mastered at Bernie Grundman Mastering, Hollywood, California

Charts and certifications

Weekly charts

Year-end charts

Certifications

Samples
"V.I.P." contains a sample of "Alone" composed by Donald and Dalvin DeGrate and performed by Jodeci from the album Diary of a Mad Band

Songs sampled in future songs:
"When a Woman's Fed Up"
"K-I-S-S-I-N-G" by Nas from the album I Am...
"Um Pouco Mais De Malandragem" by Facção Central from the album Família Facção 
"America" by Trick Daddy featuring Society from the album Book of Thugs 
"Runnin Out of Bud" by 8Ball & MJG featuring Killer Mike from the album Ridin High 
"Thug Nigga" by Z-Ro from the album Heroin 
"Broken Man" by Anthony Hamilton from the album Back to Love 
"Thug and a Gee" by Prodeje from the album Hood 2 Da Good 
"Smoke Break" by Lil B from the album "855" Song Based Freestyle Mixtape  
"Smoke Break PT1 BASED FREESTYLE" by Lil B from the album "848" SONG BASED FREESTYLE MIXTAPE  
"Neon Cathedral" by Macklemore and Ryan Lewis featuring Allen Stone from the album The Heist 
"Did You Ever Think"
"Streets Love Me" by Foxy Brown from the album Ill Na Na 2: The Fever
"The Quan" by Foxy Brown from the album Brooklyn's Don Diva
"How to Rob" by 50 Cent featuring The Madd Rapper from the album Power of the Dollar and In Too Deep (soundtrack)

Covers
Palestinian rap group DAM has covered "Did You Ever Think".

See also
List of number-one R&B albums of 1998 (U.S.)

References

1998 albums
R. Kelly albums
Albums produced by R. Kelly